The Revolutionary Committee was a radical revolutionary organization in Persia, founded in 1904. It played an important role in the Persian Constitutional Revolution.

References

Persian Constitutional Revolution
1904 establishments in Iran